Longwall Street is a street in central Oxford, England. It runs for about 300 metres along the western flank of Magdalen College. A high, imposing 15th century stone wall separates the college from the street along its entire length. Behind part of the wall is the college's deer park. The street is actually named after the old city wall to the west of the street, now largely hidden in the grounds of New College.

Holywell Street and St Cross Road form a junction with the northern end of the street. The High forms a junction with the southern end.

Morris Motors
In 1902 William Morris (later Lord Nuffield) established his fledgling car business on the site of a disused livery stables in Longwall Street. The premises are neo-Georgian, designed by the architects Tollit and Lee and built of red brick. Production quickly outgrew the site and in 1913 Morris moved it to a new factory in Cowley, southeast of Oxford. There is a small display with information about Morris Motors in one of the windows of the former Longwall premises.

Gallery

References

Sources

External links

 The High - Longwall Street, Oxford History

Streets in Oxford
Magdalen College, Oxford